Huainan East Railway Station is located in Datong District, Huainan, Anhui Province. It is served by the Hefei–Bengbu high-speed railway. A new economic development zone called Binhu New Area is planned to be built near the station.

See also
 Huainan South railway station
 Huainan railway station

References

Railway stations in Anhui
Railway stations in China opened in 2012
Stations on the Hefei–Bengbu High-Speed Railway